Barbados competed at the 2019 Pan American Games in Lima, Peru from July 26 to August 11, 2019.

On July 19, 2019, the Barbados Olympic Association announced a team of 31 (16 men and 15 women) athletes competing in 12 sports. Surfer Chelsea Tuach was also named as the country's flag bearer during the opening ceremony.

During the opening ceremony of the games, surfer Chelsea Tuach carried the flag of the country as part of the parade of nations.

Hurdler Shane Brathwaite won the country's first ever gold medal at the Pan American Games. Brathwaite's medal was the only one that was won by the country. This ranked the country an equal 23rd with the British Virgin Islands.

Competitors
The following is the list of number of competitors (per gender) participating at the games per sport/discipline.

Medalists
The following competitors from Barbados won medals at the games. In the by discipline sections below, medalists' names are bolded.

Athletics (track and field)

Barbados qualified ten athletes (four men and six women).

Key
Note–Ranks given for track events are for the entire round
Q = Qualified for the next round
q = Qualified for the next round as a fastest loser
NR = National record
PB = Personal best
SB = Seasonal best

Men
Track events

Women
Track events

Badminton

Barbados qualified a team of four badminton athletes (two per gender).

Singles

Doubles

Cycling

Barbados qualified one female cyclist.

Track
Women

Equestrian

Barbados qualified a single equestrian.

Dressage

Golf

Barbados qualified one female golfer. Emily Odwin was the youngest female golfer at the games, and finished in a tie for 26th place in a field of 32 golfers.

Sailing

Barbados received a universality spot in the women's laser radial event.

Women

Shooting

Barbados qualified three sport shooters (two men and one woman).

Surfing

Barbados qualified one female surfer in the sport's debut at the Pan American Games.

Women

Swimming

Barbados qualified four swimmers (three men and one woman).

Taekwondo

Barbados received one wildcard in the men's +80 kg event.

Kyorugi
Men

Tennis

Barbados qualified three male tennis players.

Men

Triathlon

Barbados qualified one male triathlete.

Men

See also
Barbados at the 2020 Summer Olympics

References

Nations at the 2019 Pan American Games
2019
2019 in Barbadian sport